Grotella soror is a moth in the genus Grotella, of the family Noctuidae. The species was first described by William Barnes and James Halliday McDunnough in 1912. It is found in North America, including Arizona, its type location.

References

Grotella
Taxa named by William Barnes (entomologist)
Taxa named by James Halliday McDunnough
Moths described in 1912